Daebu-dong is a neighborhood of Danwon-gu, Ansan, Gyeonggi Province, South Korea.

External links
 Daebu-dong 

Danwon-gu
Neighbourhoods in Ansan